LAAC may refer to:

 Los Angeles Athletic Club
 Los Angeles Area Council
 Latin America Amateur Championship
 Lieu d'Art et d'Action Contemporaine, Dunkerque, a museum in France
 Long acting anticholinergic, a type of drug, such as tiotropium
 Left Atrial Appendage Closure